The 2022–23 Tunisian Cup (Coupe de Tunisie) or Hédi Chaker Cup is the 91st season of the football cup competition of Tunisia.
The competition is organized by the Fédération Tunisienne de Football (FTF) and open to all clubs in Tunisia.

First preliminary round

Second preliminary round
The draw for the second preliminary round was held on 23 January 2023.

Round of 32
The draw for the round of 32 was held on 30 January 2023.

Round of 16
The draw for the round of 16 was held on 30 January 2023 (after the round of 32 draw).

Quarter-finals
The draw for the quarter-finals was held on 30 January 2023 (after the round of 32 and the round of 16 draws).

Semi-finals

The date of the draw has not yet been set.

Qualified teams:
Club Africain
Olympique Béja
Stade Tunisien

Final
The final will be played in 2023 at Stade Taïeb Mhiri, Sfax.

See also
2022–23 Tunisian Ligue Professionnelle 1

References

External links
Fédération Tunisienne de Football

Tunisian Cup
1
2022–23 African domestic association football cups